Pandakkal (IAST: pantakkal) is a town which forms a part of  Mahé municipality of Puducherry, India. Pandhakkal is also known as "Pandhokaad". Pandhakkal is a small town which lies at the edge of Mahe.

Institutions

Schools
Jawahar Navodaya Vidyalaya, Mahe
I. K. Kumaran Government Higher Secondary School
Genesis International School
Government Lower Primary School
Moolakkadavu Lower Primary School
Ideal Nursery and Upper Primary school

Temples
Pandokkaavú Ayappa temple
Pandokkooloth temple
Manikkaampoil temple

References 
 

Cities and towns in Mahe district